The 2019–20 season will be Érd HC's 10th competitive and consecutive season in the Nemzeti Bajnokság I and 46nd year in existence as a handball club.

Players

Squad information

Goalkeepers
 13   Kinga Janurik (c)
 97  Julie Foggea
Left Wingers
 53  Natalie Schatzl
 91  Réka Bízik
 93  Szonja Gávai
Right Wingers
 3  Alexandra do Nascimento
 32  Réka Király
 33  Katarina Krpež-Šlezak (pregnant)
Line players
 3  Armilla Simon
 8  Laura Szabó
 14  Anett Kisfaludy

Left Backs
 43  Rita Termány
 46  Gabriella Landi
 51  Markéta Jeřábková
Centre Backs
 24  Jovana Kovačević
 96  Gabriella Tóth
Right Backs
 9  Jelena Lavko
 23  Nikolett Kiss

Transfers
Source:  hetmeteres.hu

 In:
 Réka Bízik (from Mosonmagyaróvár)
  Alexandra do Nascimento (from Alba Fehérvár)
 Rita Termány (from MTK Budapest)

 Out:
 Barbara Kovács (to Budaörs)
 Gabriella Landi (loan to Budaörs)
  Coralie Lassource (to  Brest Bretagne)
 Sára Reizinger (to Budaörs)

Club

Technical Staff

Source: Coach & Staff

Uniform
 Supplier: 2Rule
 Main sponsor: tippmix / Noé Állatotthon
 Back sponsor: Di-Fer Kft.

Competitions

Overview

Nemzeti Bajnokság I

Results by round

Matches

Results overview

Hungarian Cup

Matches

EHF Cup

Third qualifying round

Érd HC won, 64–62 on aggregate.

Group stage

Matches

Results overview

Statistics

Top scorers
Includes all competitive matches. The list is sorted by shirt number when total goals are equal.
Last updated on 30 January 2020

Attendances
List of the home matches:

References

External links
 
 Érd HC at eurohandball.com

 
Érd HC